Abbé Claude-Joseph Drioux (17 February 1820 – 13 May 1898) was a French priest, popular educator, cartographer, geographer, historian, and religious writer.

Drioux was born 17 February 1820 at Bourdons, Haute-Marne. He was first priest, then professor at the seminary of Langres, vicaire général, finally chanoine.

Drioux was the "star author" of the publishers Belin. The 51 school textbooks of the Abbé Drioux had a great vogue in France for over thirty years and some ran to 30 editions, "they almost had a monopoly on the education of children of both sexes in the free institutions both primary and secondary schools of our country"  The total number of books sold exceeded one million. This author derived a steady income from Belin allowing him to purchase the Chateau de Lanty, Nièvre, Bourgogne, France, former property of the Marquise de Coligny, where he died 13 May 1898.

As a religious writer and popular educator Drioux was influential not only on schoolchildren but adults in bringing the findings of German scholars to the popular French audience. His pictorial Bible (1864) and history of Rome (1876) contain many interpretations evidently sourced from contemporary German sources, but also renaissance sources such as Menochius. He perhaps independently identified the "five brothers" as the sons of Annas and the "rich man" as Caiaphas in the parable of Lazarus in Luke 16.

As a geographer Drioux worked primarily with cartographer Charles Leroy. As an editor of Latin theological works he worked with a series of co-editors.

Works
 1859 Nouvel Atlas de Géographie Moderne (with Charles Leroy)
 1864 La Bible populaire : histoire illustrée de l'Ancien et du Nouveau Testament. Paris, Hachette, 1864-1865. 2 vol.
 1876 Cours abrégé d'histoire romaine: depuis la foundation de Rome jusqu'à l'invasion des Arabes.
 1867 Atlas Universel et Classique de Géographie (with Charles Leroy)
 1878 Cosmographie ou Tableau des Systèmes du Monde (with Charles Leroy)
 1872 La Sainte Bible en latin et en français avec les commentaires de Ménochius et des notes historiques et théologiques, 8 vols. Paris, Berche et Tralin Paris (reissued 1892 - this parallel text of the Vulgate and the French paraphrase translation by R.P. De Carrières contained both the comments of Menochius and those of Drioux on the French.)
 1880 Thomas Aquinas Summa Theologica (one of three translator-editors)
 1881 Nouvel Atlas Universel et Classique de Géographie

References

Bibliography and notes in French

External links
 

1820 births
1898 deaths
19th-century French cartographers
19th-century French Roman Catholic priests
French male non-fiction writers
19th-century French historians
19th-century French male writers